Jason Michael Gedrick (born February 7, 1965) is an American actor best known for his work on the television series Murder One and Boomtown, and the motion picture Iron Eagle as Doug Masters.

Early life
Jason Michael Gedroic was born in Chicago, Illinois and is of Polish descent. He changed his surname to the homonymous "Gedrick" and began his career as an extra in films such as Bad Boys (1983) and Risky Business (1983). 

He had roles in The Heavenly Kid (1985), Iron Eagle (1986), and Promised Land (1987) with director Michael Hoffman, Iron Eagle II (1988 in an uncredited role for the first few minutes of the movie), Born on the Fourth of July (1989), the cult classic Rooftops (1989), Backdraft (1991), and Crossing the Bridge (1992). Gedrick then appeared in television series such as Class of '96 (1993) and Sweet Justice (1994).

In 1994, Gedrick starred in the film The Force with Yasmine Bleeth and Kim Delaney. He starred in the first season of Steven Bochco's 1995 television series Murder One, which followed the trial of Gedrick's character, bad-boy actor Neil Avedon, alleged to have murdered a 15-year-old girl. Due to struggling ratings, he was among several cast members removed from the show and replaced by Anthony LaPaglia. His next major project was the three-hour TV film The Third Twin (1997), a thriller based on the best-selling 1996 novel by the British writer Ken Follett; in it, Gedrick plays a university employee accused of rape, whose friend later discovers he has a twin—and actually several more twins cloned by an evil millionaire university donor and biomedical technology CEO.

Gedrick next took roles in television series such as EZ Streets (1996), Falcone (2000), and The Beast (2001), none of which were major successes. In 1999, he guest starred on Ally McBeal as the "hot car wash guy". He also appeared in Mario Puzo's 1997 miniseries, The Last Don, and in its sequel, The Last Don II. Gedrick returned to television screens as Tom Turcotte in 2002's Boomtown. The series, which also starred Donnie Wahlberg and Neal McDonough, was a moderate success, but ratings plummeted – particularly after the second season altered the show’s format, and Boomtown was cancelled.

In 2003, Gedrick played Andrew Luster, the infamous rapist in a Lifetime movie based on his trial, A Date with Darkness. Gedrick was part of the cast of the 2006 NBC television series Windfall, also starring Luke Perry and Gedrick's former Boomtown alumnus, Lana Parrilla. In 2007, Gedrick again starred alongside Donnie Wahlberg in the A&E original movie Kings of South Beach. He was also the new love interest at Scavo's Pizzeria in Desperate Housewives in seasons 3 and 4, on ABC. In 2009, he appeared in Lie to Me. 

In 2011, he appeared in Necessary Roughness as Dr. J. D. Aldridge, a former graduate school professor and possible love interest for series lead Callie Thorne. He starred in the 2006 movie Hidden Places alongside Sydney Penney and Shirley Jones. 

Gedrick was a member of the cast of the HBO series Luck, which ran for one season in 2012. Gedrick appears in a multi-episode arc playing the manager of a Miami-area gentlemen’s club that becomes linked to a high-profile murder case in season 7 of Dexter.  Beginning in November 2012, Gedrick starred as Evan Farnsworth, a struggling professor at a prestigious Maine boarding school, in the Hallmark film The Wishing Tree. 

In late 2012, Gedrick appeared on an episode of NBC's Grimm. In 2015, he had a season-long arc as serial killer Raynard Waits in the Amazon Prime original television series  Bosch, along with a recurring role as Liam in The CW's 2012 series Beauty & the Beast. In 2016, Gedrick starred as estranged Det. Mark Hickman, Lt. Mike Tao's ex-partner, on Major Crimes.

Filmography

References

External links
 

American people of Polish descent
American male television actors
American male film actors
Male actors from Chicago
1965 births
Living people